In human sexuality, the refractory period is usually the recovery phase after orgasm, during which it is physiologically impossible for a man to have additional orgasms. This phase begins immediately after ejaculation and lasts until the excitement phase of the human sexual response cycle begins anew with low-level response. Although it is generally reported that women do not experience a refractory period and can thus experience an additional orgasm (or multiple orgasms) soon after the first one, some sources state that both men and women experience a refractory period because women may also experience a moment after orgasm in which further sexual stimulation does not produce excitement.

Factors and theories
Although the refractory period varies widely among individuals, ranging from minutes to days, most men cannot achieve or maintain an erection during this time, and many perceive a psychological feeling of satisfaction and are temporarily uninterested in further sexual activity; the penis may be hypersensitive and further sexual stimulation may feel painful during this time frame.

An increased infusion of the hormone oxytocin during ejaculation is believed to be chiefly responsible for the male refractory period, and the amount by which oxytocin is increased may affect the length of each refractory period. Another chemical which is considered to be responsible for the male refractory period is prolactin,  which is repressed by dopamine, and is responsible for sexual arousal. 

It is additionally proposed that the gonadotropin inhibitory hormone (GnIH), which is considered to inhibit the hypothalamic-pituitary-gonadal axis and sexual functions causes refractoriness of the post-ejaculatory refractory period. This hypothesis also supports the increase of oxytocin and prolactin after orgasm in accordance with the previous studies.

An alternative theory explains the male refractory period in terms of a peripheral autonomic feedback mechanism, rather than through central chemicals like oxytocin, serotonin, and prolactin. Autonomic feedback is already known to regulate other physiologic systems, such as breathing, blood pressure, and gut motility. This theory suggests that after male ejaculation, decreased wall tension in structures such as the seminal vesicles leads to a change in the fine autonomic signals sent from these organs, effectively creating a negative feedback loop. Such a mechanism is similar to decreased gastric and bowel motility once gastric contents have passed through. Once the feedback loop has been created, the refractory period remains until the loop is broken through restoration of the wall tension in the seminal vesicles. As men age, the time to restore tension in the seminal vesicles increases.

The female sexual response is more varied than that of men, and women are more capable than men of attaining additional or multiple orgasms through further sexual stimulation. However, many women experience clitoral hypersensitivity after orgasm, which can effectively create a refractory period. These women may be capable of further orgasms, but the pain involved in getting there makes the prospect undesirable.

Other studies
Men may also have a reduced refractory period and may be capable of multiple orgasms. According to some studies, 18-year-old males have a refractory period of about 15 minutes, while those in their 70s take about 20 hours, with the average for all men being approximately half an hour. Although rarer, some males exhibit no refractory period or a refractory period lasting less than 10 seconds. A scientific study attempting to document natural, fully ejaculatory, multiple orgasms in an adult man was conducted at Rutgers University in 1995. During the study, six fully ejaculatory orgasms occurred in 36 minutes, with no apparent refractory period. In 2002, P. Haake et al. reported a single male individual producing multiple orgasms without elevated prolactin response.

See also 

 Post-coital tristesse
 Coolidge effect

References

External links 

 Glossary of clinical sexology 

Human sexuality
Orgasm
Sexual health